Wilma Elles (born 18 October 1986) is a German actress, model and fashion designer.

Biography
Elles is the second of a family of five children. Her father and mother are in the engineering distribution business. 
She graduated from school with Abitur at the French-German bilingual Burgau-Gymnasium in Düren with a 1,8 grade. Since the age of ten, she engaged in school theatre plays, took acting, guitar and dance classes. She also studies at the University of Cologne.

One of her first roles Elles played in the majeure German TV production  of Joseph Vilsmaier. Then she got her first lead roles as Kika in the cinema movie Das Weinen davor by Gökhan Sayim, which was screened at German cinema in summer 2010, Maria in Turk Usulu of Mehmet Günes and Lilly in the production The End by Joachim Mais with Christine Kaufmann and Martin Semmelrogge. On stage she performed e.g. in the theatre Theater im Hof in Cologne.

In 2010 she got an offer for one of the lead characters, Caroline, in Turkish TV series Öyle Bir Geçer Zaman ki on Kanal D, which was over after three seasons. As she couldn't speak Turkish at the beginning of the shootings, she just memorized the phonetics of her lines for her role until she learned more Turkish. She speaks English, German (mother language) and French. The series received many awards and broke viewer records with a continuous weekly market share of 50-60% (and up to 73%), and an average of 25–30 million viewers each week in Turkey. It was screened in 70 countries including Bolivia, Colombia, Argentinia, the United States, Chile, Afghanistan, Algeria, Azerbaijan, Bulgaria, Cyprus, Egypt, Iran, Palestine, Kazakhstan, Lebanon, Macedonia, Mali, Saudi Arabia, Serbia, the Emirates and other countries.

Elles was awarded Best Actress at the European Quality Awards 2011. She was selected the Best Femme Fatale of Turkish TV in 2012 and also she was selected as the meanest character of Turkish TV with 48.6%.

During the summer break 2011, she played an Australian woman in the cinema movie Çanakkale Çocukları from Sinan Çetin and a French character in the movie El Yazısı, the script of which was awarded a prize at the Golden Orange Film Festival and that was screened in Turkish cinema in spring 2012.
Then, she gave life to the lead character of Elisabeth in the cinema movie Laz Vampir and played the lead of Olivia in the US-American-Dutch-Turkish co-production Tragedy in 2012. 
In 2013 again shot two cinema movies during the summer break. In Bir Gece she portrayed the lead role of Leyla and in Bu İşte Bir Yalnızlık Var she was seen in the role of Diana.She played in the movies "Eyvah Karim" and the female lead in the movie "Mendilim Kekik kokuyor" which ia coming out in the cinema the 6. of march 2020.In Germany she played the role of Katherina in the movie "Gegen den Wind - Die Rückkehr" which will come out in the German cinema in Autumn 2020.

Furthermore, Elles does modelling and appeared with shootings in Vogue, Elle, Tempo, Miss, Grazia - magazines e.g. and has been on the cover of Elle Bulgaria, GQ Turkey, Instyle Home Turkey, Tempo and other magazines and appears on the catwalk in many fashion shows e.g. at the Istanbul and Berlin Fashion Week 2011, 2012, 2013. Also she was the front model at the Fashion week New York and Loa Angeles for the brand Artistixin 2014, 2015. And she was the front model for the designer Emre Tamer in the London Fashion week 2020.

In the summer 2012 Wilma Elles designed and brought out the worldwide first Feng-Shui Clothing line "Maya Collection" for the company Âdil Işık.

Wilma Elles told about her interest in foreign cultures. She got the Turkish citizenship next to her German citizenship in 2016. She finished at the department of political science of the Cologne University, Islamic Studies and Theatre/Movies Studies with the high degree of 1,8.

Filmography 
Films by title, with year, and role and company:
 Arka Sokaklar, 2019–2020; Turkish TV series
 Yeter, 2015, as Idil; Turkish TV series
 Senden Bana Kalan, 2015, as Emma; Turkish movie
 Emicem Hospital, 2015; Turkish movie
 Filinta, 2014, as Anita von Wilhelm; Turkish TV series
 Gurbette Aşk, 2013, as Helga; Turkish TV series
 Öyle Bir Geçer Zaman Ki, 2010–2013, as Caroline
 Çanakkale Çocukları, 2011, as Catherine; Plato Film, Cinema-movie
 El Yazisi, 2011, as Julie; Cinema-movie
 Bir gece, 2013, as Leyla; Cinema-movie
 Bu iste bir yalnizlik var, 2013, as Diana; Cinema-movie
 Ihr mich auch (You and Me Both), 2010, as Tina Schulz; ZDF-Movie
 Fahr zur Hölle, 2010, as Lilly
 Das Ding (The Thing), 2010; Sony Pictures
 Türk Usulü, 2008, as Maria
 , 2008, as Lieselotte; ZDF-Movie
 Komissar Stolberg, 2007, as Petra Schnuck
 Das Weinen davor, 2007, as Kika
 Cologne P.D., 2007, as Frau Reese
 Gameshow Marathon, 2007, as Glücksfee
 Das Spielzeug, 2007, as Van
 Cauliflower Power, 2007, as Caulie, Daulie and Anne
 Heilige Konflikte (Holy Conflict), 2007, as Schwester Katharina
 Zeltgeflüster, 2007, as Fiona
 Kill or Be Killed, 2007, as Sibyll
 Speak My Language, 2006, as Natascha
 Ich und die Anderen (I and the Others), 2006, as Nicky
 Eine traumhafte Beziehung, 2005, Susanne
 Das Puppenspiel (The Puppy Game), 2005, Puppy

Theatre 
 Hänsel und Gretel, 2010, as Hexe
 Weihnachten in Transsilvanien (Christmas in Transylvania), 2009, as Venetia
 Die Ratten, 2006, as Frau John
 Woyzeck, 2006, as Marie
 Yard Girls, 2006, as Bo
 Die Zoogeschichte (The Zoo Story), 2004, as Jerry
 Antigone, 2004, as Antigone
 Das Zieglein..., 2003, as Hapeangul
 Arsen und Spitzenhäubchen, 2003, as Mortimer
 Bird Cage, 2003, as Agador
 Top Dogs, 2003, as Krause
 Das Hohelied, 2002, as Sie
 Biedermann ... Brandstifter, 2002, as Babette

References

External links 
 
 

1986 births
Living people
Actors from Cologne
German television actresses
German stage actresses
Turkish television actresses
Turkish stage actresses
German emigrants to Turkey
German expatriates in Turkey
Naturalized citizens of Turkey
University of Cologne alumni